Gonville may refer to:
 Gonville, New Zealand, suburb of Whanganui
 Gonville Bromhead (1845–1891), British Army officer awarded the Victoria Cross
 Gonville ffrench-Beytagh (1912–1991), Anglican priest and anti-apartheid activist 
 Edmund Gonville (died 1351), founder of the college Gonville Hall, another college, two religious houses and a hospital, King's Clerk to King Edward III of England

See also
 Gonville and Caius College, Cambridge, a constituent college of the University of Cambridge, descended from Gonville Hall
 Gonville and Caius Range, a mountain range in Antarctica